Mount Agassiz Ski Resort was a ski resort located in Riding Mountain National Park near McCreary, Manitoba, that operated from 1961 to 2000. With a vertical of over 500 ft, it was in its time considered to offer some of the best skiing between the Rockies and Thunder Bay.

History
Mount Agassiz was first developed in the late 1950s when around 142 hectares was leased to a private operator for the development of a ski resort. In 1961, the Mount Agassiz ski area officially opened with a rope tow, and a handful of ski runs, and a new base lodge. It was in 1979 when a new Skyway double chairlift was purchased and installed on the north side, providing the ski area with expert runs. The ski resort operated for many successful years and provided many economic benefits to the nearby town of McCreary. However, starting in the 1990s, the ski hill started to see a downturn in the number of skier visits. The owner filed for bankruptcy two times: once in 1995, and once in 2000. Since 2000, the ski area has not operated, despite a strong interest to rehabilitate the ski area.

Parks Canada Redevelopment
In 2007, Parks Canada introduced a new strategic goal for the Mount Agassiz Ski Resort, which precluded the possibility of reopening the ski resort. Although this motion was tabled, it still developed a negative reaction in the community. In January 2011, Parks Canada introduced a feasibility study for the future of the ski resort. It was estimated that it would cost over twenty million dollars to rehabilitate the ski resort. Only one party made a bid on the ski resort, which was denied by Parks Canada, citing it didn't meet all requirements. In 2014, Parks Canada made the decision to redevelop the former ski resort back into its natural state. Demolition of the lodge and ski lifts was completed by September 2015.

References

External links 
 https://winnipegsun.com/2015/02/19/a-molehill-out-of-a-mountain/wcm/493ad689-ccf4-472b-bbbb-78292979eeaa
 http://parkscanadahistory.com/publications/riding/mount-agassiz-feasibility-study-summary-e-2012.pdf
 https://winnipegsun.com/2015/02/19/a-molehill-out-of-a-mountain/wcm/493ad689-ccf4-472b-bbbb-78292979eeaa

Defunct ski areas and resorts
Riding Mountain National Park
Parkland Region, Manitoba